The 2021–22 PGA Tour of Australasia, titled as the 2021–22 ISPS Handa PGA Tour of Australasia for sponsorship reasons, was a series of men's professional golf events played mainly in Australia. The main tournaments on the PGA Tour of Australasia are played in the southern summer, so they are split between the first and last months of the year.

European Tour strategic alliance extension
In January, it was announced by the European Tour that they had extended their strategic alliance with the PGA Tour of Australasia, which had originally been signed in 2017. As part of the extension, an additional two players (three in total) from the PGA Tour of Australasia Order of Merit were awarded European Tour status for the following season.

Schedule
The following table lists official events during the 2021–22 season.

Order of Merit
The Order of Merit was based on prize money won during the season, calculated in Australian dollars. The top three players on the tour (not otherwise exempt) earned status to play on the 2023 European Tour.

Awards

Notes

References

External links

PGA Tour of Australasia
Australasia
Australasia
PGA Tour of Australasia
PGA Tour of Australasia
PGA Tour of Australasia
PGA Tour of Australasia
PGA Tour of Australasia